Edward FitzGerald (1738–1814) was an Irish politician.  He was sat in the Irish House of Commons as a Member of Parliament (MP) for Clare from 1776 to 1790, and as MP for Castlebar  from 1790 to 1797.

His son Augustine FitzGerald (1765–1834) sat in the House of Commons of the United Kingdom MP for Clare from 1808 to 1818, and as MP for Ennis briefly in early 1832.

References 

1738 births
1814 deaths
Members of the Parliament of Ireland (pre-1801) for County Clare constituencies
Members of the Parliament of Ireland (pre-1801) for County Mayo constituencies
Irish MPs 1776–1783
Irish MPs 1783–1790
Irish MPs 1790–1797